Run, Little Chillun or Run Little Chillun is a folk opera written by Hall Johnson. According to James Vernon Hatch and Leo Hamalian, it is one of the most successful musical dramas of the Harlem Renaissance. It was the first Broadway show directed by an African-American.

Development 
Run, Little Chillun or Run Little Chillun (the original score did not include the comma) is a folk opera play, or musical drama, written by Hall Johnson. The script was first published in 1996.

Plot 
The play contrasts pagan and Christian religious traditions among Blacks in the American South.

Productions 
The show premiered in 1933 on Broadway and ran for four months and 126 performances. It was revived in 1935–1937 by the Federal Theater Project and ran for two years in Los Angeles. It was directed by Clarence Edouard Muse. It was produced in 1939 in San Francisco at the Golden Gate International Exposition. In 1943 it was revived on Broadway at the Hudson Theatre. It was the first Broadway show with an African-American director, the first with an African-American composer, and the first African-American folk opera on Broadway.

Reception 
Hatch and Hamalian called it "buoyant in spirit" and said it is considered one of the most successful musical dramas of the Harlem Renaissance. Kenneth Burke said the play allowed audiences to see how American Blacks had survived in a culture of oppression. According to Eileen Southern, "the outstanding quality of the play was its music, particularly in two spectacular scenes—a revival meeting and a pagan religious orgy."

References 

1933 musicals
All-Black cast Broadway shows
African-American plays
Broadway musicals
Folk operas